For the Winter Olympics, there are eleven venues that have been or will be used for curling.

References

Venues
 
Curling
Olympic venues